Lola Montez is a 1958 Australian musical. It was written by Alan Burke, Peter Stannard, and Peter Benjamin and focuses on four days of Lola Montez visiting the Ballarat Goldfields.

Background
Stannard, Benjamin, and Burke were all friends from university who wanted to write a musical together. Alan Burke says he had never heard of Lola Montez until he heard her mentioned in a program on the ABC. He was attracted to the subject because it was Australian but had international appeal; he did not want to make something along the lines of On Our Selection. Also, since the lead was a performer, the songs would come naturally.

Productions

Original production 
Hugh Hunt of the Australian Elizabethan Theatre Trust heard several auditions of the work and agreed to fund a trial production at the Union Theatre Repertory Company in Melbourne in early 1958. It was directed by John Sumner. The production was very popular.

Cast
Justine Rettick as Lola
Neil Fitzpatrick
Glen Tomasetti
Patricia Connoly
Alan Hopgood
George Ogilvie
Robin Ramsay
Jon Finlayson
Monica Maughan.

Australian Elizabethan Theatre Trust production
The Trust took up their option and launched a new production. George Carden was brought in to direct.

Alan Burke says his dream Lola was Vivien Leigh but that he wanted Moyra Fraser to star. Hugh Hunt imported 25 year old Mary Preston from the United Kingdom to play the lead. Burke said Preston was hopelessly miscast playing a 37 year old aging beauty.

The show trialled in Brisbane for a short season. Michael Cole, playing Daniel, was sacked in Brisbane because of his voice. He was replaced by Eric Thornton, who Burke said was too old - a 45-year-old man playing a 19-year-old. The musical moved to Sydney, where it opened on 22 October 1958. Burke says it lost £30,000 and "was a show loved by very few people but it went into legend." However the show did run for more than three months. Michael Cole's single recording of "Saturday Girl" became a minor hit.

Cole later appeared in the TV musical Pardon Miss Westcott which was commissioned from the writers of Lola Montez.

Cast
Mary Preston as Lola
Frank Wilson as Sam
Michael Cole, then Eric Thornton, as Daniel

The production and costumes were designed by Hermia Boyd. A retrospective celebration of the work  was mounted in February 2018 at the Smorgon Family Plaza, Arts Centre Melbourne.

1962 television play
Lola Montez was adapted for TV by the Australian Broadcasting Corporation in 1962.

Lola and the Highwayman

In 1965, the ABC presented a TV special called Lola and the Highwayman. It consisted of selected songs from Lola Montez and another Australian musical The Highwayman. Melbourne producer Fred Axian said "some of the melodies from these musicals are among the best in the world." Songs selected from the musical were interwoven in a story to give it continuity. Eleven songs were used in all.

An extract from the production is at the State Library of New South Wales.

Cast
Suzanne Steele as Lola
Jon Weaving

Select Songs
"Gold, God of the World"

Revised edition
The musical has been much revived since in amateur and school productions.

The musical was heavily revised in 1988 for a production in Canberra.

References

External links
Australian productions at Ausstage
Lola Montez at AustLit
Original theatre production at the Trust
Clip of "Saturday Girl" from 1965 TV production

Australian musicals
1950s Australian plays
1958 musicals
Cultural depictions of Lola Montez